The Fourth Wise Man is a 1985 American television film directed by Michael Ray Rhodes and starring Martin Sheen, Eileen Brennan and Alan Arkin.

The story was adapted from Henry van Dyke Jr.'s 1895 short story, The Other Wise Man.

Cast
Martin Sheen as Artaban
Adam Arkin as Joseph
Eileen Brennan as Judith
Ralph Bellamy as Abgarus
Richard Libertini as Tigranes
Lance Kerwin as Passhur
Harold Gould as Rabbi
Alan Arkin as Orontes
Greg Mullavey as Rhodespes
James Farentino as Jesus (voice)
Ramon Estevez as Ekron

References

External links
 
 

American Broadcasting Company television specials
1985 television films
1985 films
ABC Movie of the Week
Films scored by Bruce Langhorne
Films directed by Michael Ray Rhodes
1980s English-language films